The Republic of Nicaragua elects on the national level a head of state – the president – and a unicameral legislature. The President of Nicaragua and his or her vice-president are elected on one ballot for a five-year term by the people.

The National Assembly (Asamblea Nacional) has 92 members: 90 deputies elected for a five-year term by proportional representation (20 nationally and 70 regionally), the outgoing president, and the runner-up in the last presidential election. Should the president be reelected (not originally planned for in the Nicaraguan constitution), the outgoing vice president takes the seat reserved for him instead.

Nicaragua has a multi-party system.

Latest elections

2021 Presidential Election

2021 National Assembly Election

2021 Central American Parliament Election

2019 autonomous regional elections 
The eighth autonomous elections on the Caribbean Coast took place on March 3, 2019. The voters elected 45 members to each Regional Council in the RACCN and the RACCS.

(These results are preliminary, as voting is still being counted by the Supreme Electoral Council).

 Sandinista National Liberation Front (FSLN) - 64 seats (RACCN: 30, RACCS: 34)
 Yapti Tasba Masraka Nanih Aslatakanka (YATAMA) - 14 seats (RACCN: 12, RACCS: 2)
 Constitutionalist Liberal Party (PLC) - 12 seats (RACCN: 3, RACCS: 9)

Total votes for all participating parties:
 Sandinista National Liberation Front (FSLN) - 81,503 (55.03%)
 Yapti Tasba Masraka Nanih Aslatakanka (YATAMA) - 27,522 (18.63%)
 Constitutionalist Liberal Party (PLC) - 23,907 (16.14%)
 Conservative Party - 364 (0.25%)
 Multiethnic Indigenist Party (PIM) - 1,219 (0.82%)
 Nicaraguan Liberal Alliance (ALN) - 622 (0.45%)
 Alliance for the Republic (APRE) - 334 (0.23%)
 Independent Liberal Party (PLI) - 1,428 (0.96%)
 Democratic Restoration Party (PRD) - 278 votes (0.18%)
 Citizens for Liberty (CXL) - 8,390 (5.67%)
 Myatamaran - 700 votes (0.47%)
 Moskitia Pawanka - 614 votes (0.41%)
 Neoliberal Party (PAL) - 1,113 votes (0.75%)

Source:

Past elections

Presidential elections 1984-2011

1984
The 1984 election took place on November 4. Of the 1,551,597 citizens registered in July, 1,170,142 voted (75.41%). The null votes were 6% of the total. The national averages of valid votes for president were:

Daniel Ortega, Sandinista National Liberation Front (FSLN) - 66.97%
Clemente Guido, Democratic Conservative Party (PCD) - 14.04%
Virgilio Godoy, Independent Liberal Party (PLI) - 9.60%
Mauricio Diaz, Popular Social Christian Party (PPSC) - 5.56%
Allan Zambrana, Nicaraguan Communist Party (PCdeN) - 1.45%
Domingo Sánchez Sancho, Nicaraguan Socialist Party (PSN) - 1.31%
Isidro Téllez, Marxist-Leninist Popular Action Movement (MAP-ML) - 1.03%

The pro-Sandinista magazine, Envio claimed that this election was considered to have the "most freedom of choice" in the nation's history and was approved by international advocates of free elections.

1990
The historical election of 1990 took place on February 25. The total registered voters were 1,752,088 and the abstentions 241,250 or 13.7%. The United Nicaraguan Opposition coalition of those who opposed the ruling Sandinista National Liberation Front was victorious, winning 55% of the vote. Violeta Chamorro became president. The national averages of valid votes for president were:

Violeta Barrios de Chamorro, National Opposition Union (UNO) - 777,552 votes - 54.73%
Daniel Ortega, Sandinista National Liberation Front (FSLN) - 579,886 votes - 40.82%
Other - 63,106 - 4.45%

1996
In presidential elections, Arnoldo Alemán of the Liberal Alliance-Liberal Constitutionalist Party defeated Daniel Ortega of the Sandinista National Liberation Front. A record number of 24 parties and alliances participated in these elections.

Arnoldo Alemán, Liberal Alliance - 51.03%
Daniel Ortega, Sandinista National Liberation Front (FSLN) - 37.75%
Guillermo Osorno, Nicaraguan Party of the Christian Path (CCN) - 4.10%
Noel Vidaurre, Nicaraguan Conservative Party (PCN) - 2.26%
Other (20 other candidates with less than 1% of the votes) - 4.86%

2001

2006

2011

2016

Parliamentary election results 1984-2016

1984
The 1984 parliamentary election was held together with the presidential election on November 4. The percentages for National Assembly representatives were very similar to those the parties had received for their presidential candidate. The electoral quotient needed to win one of the 90 National Assembly seats was obtained by dividing the number of valid votes in each region by the number of representatives that had been assigned to each region, proportional to its population.

Each party's "left over" votes—those insufficient to earn it a seat in a given region—were then added together and re-tallied nationally. The seats earned in this second count went to the next candidate on the party's slate in the regions where it had come closest to winning on the first round. In addition, any party getting at least 1% of the presidential vote (which all six losing parties did) was allowed a seat for its defeated presidential candidate. The final composition of the National Assembly was thus:

Sandinista National Liberation Front (FSLN) - 61 seats
Democratic Conservative Party (PCD) - 14 seats
Independent Liberal Party (PLI) - 9 seats
Popular Social Christian Party (PPSC) - 6 seats
Nicaraguan Communist Party (PCdeN) - 2 seats
Nicaraguan Socialist Party (PSN) - 2 seats
Marxist-Leninist Popular Action Movement (MAP-ML) - 2 seats

Source:

1990
The 1990 parliamentary election was held together with the presidential election on February 25. The final composition of the National Assembly in 1990 was:

National Opposition Union (UNO) - 51 seats
Sandinista National Liberation Front (FSLN) - 39 seats
Democratic Conservative Party (PCD) - 3 seats
Independent Liberal Party (PLI) - 3 seats
Popular Social Christian Party (PPSC) - 3 seats
Nicaraguan Communist Party (PCdeN) - 3 seats
Nicaraguan Socialist Party (PSN) - 3 seats
Marxist-Leninist Popular Action Movement (MAP-ML) - 3 seats
Revolutionary Unity Movement (MUR) - 1 seat
Social Christian Party (PSC) - 1 seat

Note: The 1990 Assembly members are joined by any presidential candidate who receives over 1% of the vote

Sources:

1996
The 1996 elections for the National Assembly took place together with the Presidential election on October 20. The final composition of the National Assembly in 1996 was:
Liberal Alliance (AL) - 42 seats
Sandinista National Liberation Front (FSLN) - 36 seats
Nicaraguan Party of the Christian Path (CCN) - 4 seats
Nicaraguan Conservative Party (PCN) - 3 seats
National Project (PRONAL) - 2 seats
Nicaraguan Resistance Party (PRN) - 1 seat
Sandinista Renovation Movement (MRS) - 1 seat
Unity Alliance (AU) - 1 seat
Independent Liberal Party (PLI) - 1 seat
National Conservative Action (ANC) - 1 seat
UNO-96 Alliance (UNO-96) - 1 seat

Source:

2001

2006

2011

 2016 legislative election

Municipal election results 1990-2017

1990
The 1990 municipal election was held together with the presidential and the parliamentary elections on February 25. Municipal Councils were elected in 131 municipalities nationwide. The final results for the elections were:

National Opposition Union (UNO) - 98 municipalities controlled
Sandinista National Liberation Front (FSLN) - 31 municipalities controlled
Central American Unionist Party (PUCA) - 2 municipalities controlled

Sources:

1996
A great expectation in the 1996 municipal elections was the participation for the first (and last) time of what the Electoral Law terms "popular subscription associations". According to the Electoral Law, to be formed, an association needed, among other things, to present to the Supreme Electoral Council a "written request signed by a minimum of 5% of the citizens on the electoral rolls corresponding to the respective electoral area". A total of 53 associations participated in the municipal elections. One of them (the Civic Association of Potosí) won the mayor's post.

Despite winning only one municipality, an important number of association candidates finished in second or third place. In the nation's capital, Managua, two independent candidates; Pedro Solórzano of the Viva Managua Movement association and Herty Lewites of the Sol (sun) association competed against the AL and FSLN official candidates. ALN's Roberto Cedeño got the 28% of the votes followed closely by Solórzano with 26%, Carlos Guadamúz from the FSLN with 25.7% and Herty Lewites who became Managua's mayor four years later came in fourth place with 12.3%.

The 1996 municipal election took place together with the Presidential election on October 20. Municipal Councils were elected in 145 municipalities nationwide. The final results for the elections were:

Liberal Alliance (AL) - 92 municipalities controlled
Sandinista National Liberation Front (FSLN) - 51 municipalities controlled
Sandinista Renovation Movement (MRS) - 1 municipality controlled
Civic Association of Potosí (ACP) - 1 municipality controlled

Source:

2000
In the 2000 municipal election 1,532,816 voters elected Municipal Councils in 151 municipalities nationwide. It was the first time that the Presidential and Municipal elections were held separately. The final results for the elections were:

Constitutionalist Liberal Party (PLC) - 94 municipalities controlled
Sandinista National Liberation Front (FSLN) - 52 municipalities controlled
Conservative Party (PC) - 5 municipalities controlled

The FSLN won for the first time in ten years the municipality of Managua, Nicaragua's capital city with its candidate Herty Lewites that pulled 44% of the votes.

Source:

2004
In the 2004 municipal election 1,664,243 voters elected Municipal Councils in 152 municipalities nationwide, with nearly a 56% abstention. The final results for the elections were:

Sandinista National Liberation Front (FSLN-Convergence) - 87 municipalities controlled
Constitutionalist Liberal Party (PLC) - 57 municipalities controlled
Alliance for the Republic (APRE) - 4 municipalities controlled
Yapti Tasba Masraka Nanih Aslatakanka (YATAMA) - 3 municipalities controlled
Nicaraguan Resistance Party (PRN) - 1 municipality controlled

Note: Elections took place for the first time in the newly created municipality of San José de Bocay in the Jinotega department.

The 2004 municipal elections represented a huge Sandinista victory. The FSLN-Convergence won 14 of the 17 departmental capitals, 87 of the 152 municipalities —including 5 of the 6 that make up Managua’s greater metropolitan area— and 25 of Nicaragua’s 42 largest cities. In total it will govern a little over 4 million inhabitants, nearly 71% of the national population.

The Sandinista victory was attributed to the success of the FSLN-Convergence alliance. Of the 87 mayors elected on the FSLN ticket, 17 come from these allies: 5 are independents, 3 are from the Resistance, 3 belong to the Sandinista Renovation Movement (MRS), 2 are Conservatives, 2 are Liberals, 1 is from the Christian Unity Movement (MUC) and 1 is a Social Christian. Of the deputy mayors who ran with an FSLN mayoral candidate, 28 are Liberals, 16 are independent, 14 are from the MUC, 9 are Conservatives, 9 are from the MRS, 3 are from the Resistance and 1 is a Social Christian. These allied candidates allowed the FSLN to win 12 municipal governments for the first time.

Source:

2017 municipal elections 
In the 2017 municipal election voters elected Municipal Councils in 153 municipalities nationwide, with around 53% turnout. The final results for the elections were:

Sandinista National Liberation Front - 135 municipalities controlled
Independent Liberal Party (PLI) - 12 municipalities controlled
Yapti Tasba Masraka Nanih Aslatakanka (YATAMA) - 3 municipalities controlled
Constitutionalist Liberal Party (PLC) - 2 municipalities controlled
Nicaraguan Liberal Alliance - 1 municipality controlled

Source:

2022 municipal elections

Autonomous elections on the Caribbean Coast results 1990-2014

1990
The first autonomous elections on the Caribbean Coast took place in 1990 together with the presidential, parliamentary and municipal election on February 25. The voters elected the 45 Regional Council members in what was officially called the North Atlantic Autonomous Region (RAAN) and the 45 in the South Atlantic Autonomous Region (RAAS). The abstention was 21%, only 7% higher than the national average:

Sandinista National Liberation Front (FSLN) - 39 seats (RAAN: 21, RAAS: 18)
Yapti Tasba Masraka Nanih Aslatakanka (YATAMA) - 26 seats (RAAN: 22, RAAS: 4)
National Opposition Union (UNO) - 25 seats (RAAN: 2, RAAS: 23)

Note: National Assembly representatives also have a seat.

Sources:

1994
With an abstention of 34%, the inhabitants of the Atlantic Coast elected the 45 Regional Council members in what is officially called the North Atlantic Autonomous Region (RAAN) and the 45 in the South Atlantic Autonomous Region (RAAS) on February 27:

Constitutionalist Liberal Party (PLC) - 37 seats (RAAN: 19, RAAS: 18)
Sandinista National Liberation Front (FSLN) - 33 seats (RAAN: 19, RAAS: 14)
Yapti Tasba Masraka Nanih Aslatakanka (YATAMA) - 12 seats (RAAN: 7, RAAS: 5)
National Opposition Union (UNO) - 5 seats (RAAN: 0, RAAS: 5)
Authentic Costeño Autonomy Movement (MAAC) - 2 seats (RAAN: 0, RAAS: 2)
Costeño Democratic Alliance (ADECO) - 1 seat (RAAN: 0, RAAS: 1)

Sources:

1998
With an abstention of 40%, the inhabitants of the Atlantic Coast elected the 45 Regional Council members in what is officially called the North Atlantic Autonomous Region (RAAN) and the 45 in the South Atlantic Autonomous Region (RAAS) on March 1.:

Constitutionalist Liberal Party (PLC) - 44 seats (RAAN: 24, RAAS: 20)
Sandinista National Liberation Front (FSLN) - 25 seats (RAAN: 13, RAAS: 12)
Yapti Tasba Masraka Nanih Aslatakanka (YATAMA) - 12 seats (RAAN: 8, RAAS: 4)
Multiethnic Indigenist Party (PIM) - 7 seats (RAAN: 0, RAAS: 7)
Coast Alliance (Alianza Costeña) - 2 seats (RAAN: 0, RAAS: 2)

Sources:

2002
With an overall abstention of 50-60%, inhabitants of the Atlantic Coast elected 90 Regional Council members on March 3:

Constitutionalist Liberal Party (PLC) - 48 seats (RAAN: 17, RAAS: 31)
Sandinista National Liberation Front (FSLN) - 28 seats (RAAN: 15, RAAS: 13)
Yapti Tasba Masraka Nanih Aslatakanka (YATAMA) - 13 seats (RAAN: 12, RAAS: 1)
Multiethnic Party for Coast Unity (PAMUC) - 1 seat (RAAN: 1, RAAS: 0)

Sources:

2006
The fifth autonomous elections on the Caribbean Coast took place on March 5. The abstention was a record-high 55%. The voters elected the 45 Regional Council members in what was officially called the North Atlantic Autonomous Region (RAAN) and the 45 in the South Atlantic Autonomous Region (RAAS):

Constitutionalist Liberal Party (PLC) - 40 seats (RAAN: 18, RAAS: 22)
Sandinista National Liberation Front (FSLN) - 27 seats (RAAN: 15, RAAS: 12)
Yapti Tasba Masraka Nanih Aslatakanka (YATAMA) - 18 seats (RAAN: 12, RAAS: 6)
Nicaraguan Liberal Alliance-Conservative Party (ALN-PC) - 5 seats (RAAN: 0, RAAS: 5)

Three other parties didn't pull enough votes to win a seat in the Regional Council; the regional Multiethnic Party for Coast Unity (PAMUC), the Sandinista Renovation Movement (MRS) alliance, and Alliance for the Republic (APRE).

Source:

2010
The sixth autonomous elections on the Caribbean Coast took place on March 7. The abstention rate was 60%. The voters elected 45 Regional Council members in the RAAN and 45 in the RAAS:

Sandinista National Liberation Front (FSLN) - 41 seats (RAAN: 22, RAAS: 19)
Constitutionalist Liberal Party (PLC) - 30 seats (RAAN: 10, RAAS: 20)
Yapti Tasba Masraka Nanih Aslatakanka (YATAMA) - 16 seats (RAAN: 13, RAAS: 3)
Nicaraguan Liberal Alliance (ALN) - 2 seats (RAAN: 0, RAAS: 2)
Alliance for the Republic (APRE) - 1 seat (RAAN: 0, RAAS: 1)

Source:

2014
The seventh autonomous elections on the Caribbean Coast took place on March 2. The abstention rate was 59%. The voters elected 45 members to each Regional Council in the newly renamed North Caribbean Coast Autonomous Region (RACCN) and South Caribbean Coast Autonomous Region (RACCS):

Sandinista National Liberation Front (FSLN) - 58 seats (RACCN: 28, RACCS: 30)
Yapti Tasba Masraka Nanih Aslatakanka (YATAMA) - 15 seats (RACCN: 11, RACCS: 4)
Independent Liberal Party (PLI) - 8 seats (RACCN: 5, RACCS: 3)
Constitutionalist Liberal Party (PLC) - 7 seats (RACCN: 1, RACCS: 6)
Multiethnic Indigenist Party (PIM) - 2 seats (RACCN: 0, RACCS: 2)

Source:

See also
 Politics of Nicaragua

References

External links
International Museum of Women Feature on Women and the 2006 Elections in Nicaragua
Nicaragua on Adam Carr's Election Archive
Nicaragua page of the ACE Project